Hitchhike to Happiness is a 1945 musical that was nominated at the 18th Academy Awards in the category of Best Musical score. Which Morton Scott was nominated for.

Plot

A famous radio singer returns to New York City to reunite with her old friends who are unaware of who she is due to how she uses a stage name. She falls in love with a struggling songwriter as well.

Cast

References

External links 
 

 

1945 musical films
1945 films
American black-and-white films
1940s English-language films
Films directed by Joseph Santley
Republic Pictures films
American musical films
1940s American films